A generalized Newtonian fluid is an idealized fluid for which the shear stress is a function of shear rate at the particular time, but not dependent upon the history of deformation. Although this type of fluid is non-Newtonian (i.e. non-linear) in nature, its constitutive equation is a generalised form of the Newtonian fluid. Generalised Newtonian fluids satisfy the following rheological equation:

where  is the shear stress, and  the shear rate. The quantity  represents an apparent or effective viscosity as a function of the shear rate.

The most commonly used types of generalized Newtonian fluids are:
Power-law fluid
Cross fluid
Carreau fluid
Bingham fluid

It has been shown that Lubrication theory may be applied to all Generalized Newtonian fluids in both two and three dimensions.

See also
Navier–Stokes equations

References

Non-Newtonian fluids